Weedkiller (stylized in all caps) is the debut studio album by American singer-songwriter and rapper Ashnikko. It is scheduled for release on June 2, 2023, through Parlophone and Warner Records.

Background
The album follows the singer's 2021 debut mixtape Demidevil. Ashnikko then headlined her first tour to support the mixtape. "Panic Attacks in Paradise" and "Maggots" were released on September 29, 2021, as a double single. It was supposed to be the lead single from her debut album, but that project was eventually scrapped. The singer took a break from releasing music from that time to February 8, 2023, when she released her new single "You Make Me Sick!" as the new lead single. Casey announced the  release date, album cover, track list and world tour on March 1, 2023.

Concept
The concept behind the album is described in press materials as being "a commentary on environmental disaster and the rapid evolution of technology" that tells "the story of a fae civilization occupied and destroyed by machines that feed on organic matter where the faerie protagonist seeks revenge by becoming part machine."

Singles
"You Make Me Sick!" replaced "Panic Attacks in Paradise" and "Maggots" as the lead singles from the album. The track was released as the new lead single on February 8, 2023. A music video for the single was released on the same day. "Worms" was released on March 2, 2023 as the album's second single. Its official music video was released on March 8.

Track listing
Credits adapted from Apple Music. Track lengths taken from Qobuz.

Notes
 "Weedkiller" is stylized in all caps.

Personnel
 Ashnikko – lead vocals (1-13)
 Daniela Lalita - featured artist, vocals (4)
 Ethel Cain - featured artist, vocals (13)
 Slinger – producer (2, 3)
 Dylan Brady - producer (3)

Release history

References

 

 
2023 albums
Warner Records albums
Upcoming albums